Alexander Doolan (7 August 1889 – 19 April 1937) was a Scottish professional footballer who played as a left back.

Career
Born in Annbank, Doolan played for Kilmarnock, Bradford City and Preston North End.

For Bradford City he made 22 appearances in the Football League; he also made four appearances in the FA Cup.

Sources

References

1889 births
1937 deaths
Scottish footballers
Kilmarnock F.C. players
Bradford City A.F.C. players
Preston North End F.C. players
English Football League players
Scottish Football League players
Association football fullbacks
Footballers from South Ayrshire
FA Cup Final players